Mar Narsai D'Baz (May 17, 1940 – February 14, 2010) was the Metropolitan of Lebanon, Syria and all Europe in the Assyrian Church of the East. Born on May 17, 1940, to Rev. Elias De Baz in the village of Tel-Rumman Foqani in Syria. Ordained Bishop of Lebanon at Beirut on July 18, 1968. Elevated to the rank of Metropolitan at London on October 17, 1976. He died on February 14, 2010, in Scottsdale, Arizona, and his last rites were given at Mar Gewargis Cathedral and buried in Chicago, Illinois.

See also
Assyrian Church of the East
Assyrian Church of the East's Holy Synod

References 

1940 births
2010 deaths
20th-century bishops of the Assyrian Church of the East
Eastern Christianity in Lebanon
21st-century bishops of the Assyrian Church of the East
Syrian emigrants to the United States